The Nordica 20 is a Canadian trailerable sailboat that was designed by B. Malta-Muller as a cruiser and first built in 1975.

The Nordica 20 is most likely a development of the Malta-Muller-designed Lynaes Senior, which was built in Denmark. The Halman 20 is a development of the Nordica 20.

Production
The design was built by Nordica Yachts, a brand of Exe Fibercraft in Canada, starting in 1975, but it is now out of production.

Design
The Nordica 20 is a recreational keelboat, built predominantly of fibreglass. It has a masthead sloop rig, a spooned plumb stem, a rounded transom, a keel-mounted rudder controlled by a tiller and a fixed long keel. It displaces  and carries  of ballast.

The boat is fitted with an inboard BMW or Renault  diesel engine or an outboard motor for docking and manoeuvring. The fuel tank holds .

The design has sleeping accommodation for four people, with a double "V"-berth in the bow cabin and two straight settee berths in the main cabin.

Operational history
The boat is supported by an active class club, Nordica Boats.

In a 2010 review Steve Henkel wrote, "... best features: The springy sheer and rounded stern on both the Nordica and Halman give them a salty look. Worst features: [They] have relatively small cockpits; more than two occupants would constitute a crowd. Perhaps that is just as well, since buoyancy aft is limited by the pinched stern; more than two occupants would push the stern down, upsetting the natural trim of the hull. Consequently the extra two berths are pretty much usable only for stowage or in harbor."

See also
List of sailing boat types

Related development
Halman 20
Nordica 16

References

External links

Photo of a Nordica 20

Keelboats
1970s sailboat type designs
Sailing yachts
Trailer sailers
Sailboat types built by Exe Fibercraft
Sailboat type designs by B. Malta-Muller